Glendale Jr/Sr High School is a public school in Glendale, Oregon, United States serving middle- and high school-aged students. It is one of two schools in the Glendale School District.

Notable alumni 
Kase Saylor graduated from Glendale Jr/Sr High School in 1996. After his career in the US Army, he moved on to play for the Cincinnati Reds MLB team from 2002-2014.

Academics

In 2008, 69% of the school's seniors received a high school diploma. Of 42 students, 29 graduated, 11 dropped out, one received a modified diploma, and one was still in high school the following year.

References

Public middle schools in Oregon
High schools in Douglas County, Oregon
Public high schools in Oregon